Kimnachia is a monotypic genus of cacti. Its only species is Kimnachia ramulosa, synonym Pseudorhipsalis ramulosa, which is native from southern Mexico to northern South America and also found in Jamaica.

Description
Kimnachia ramulosa is a shrubby plant, branching freely from the base. The stems are rounded basally, with branches that become flattened towards their tips. They are reddish at first, later becoming green. They are usually borne singly and hang downwards.

Taxonomy
The species was first described by Joseph zu Salm-Reifferscheidt-Dyck in 1834, as Cereus ramulosus. It was transferred to the genus Pseudorhipsalis in 1991. In 1993, Kimnach sank Pseudorhipsalis into Disocactus as section Pseudorhipsalis, so Ps. ramulosa became Disocactus ramulosus. A molecular phylogenetic study of Disocactus in 2016 did not recover Pseudorhipsalis as either embedded within or sister to Disocactus, and hence restored the genus. A  molecular phylogenetic study of the tribe Hylocereeae was published in 2017. The results suggested that the genus Pseudorhipsalis was only monophyletic if Ps. ramulosa was removed. Accordingly the authors of the study proposed a new genus, Kimnachia, with Kimnachia ramulosa as the sole species. The genus name honours Myron William Kimnach.

References

External links

Hylocereeae
Cactoideae genera
Monotypic Cactaceae genera